Loraine Barry (born 10 December 1964) is a former professional dancer and also known for her role as a judge on the RTÉ One series, Dancing with the Stars.

Early life
Loraine Barry was born in Cabra in Dublin, Ireland. She began dancing at just six years old. By the age of nineteen, Barry began to dance competitively with her partner Andrew Sinkinson. Together Barry and Sinkinson won many Amateur titles such as British Youth Amateur Ballroom Championship. They also won the Amateur British Ballroom Championship three consecutive times in 1987, 1988, & 1989.

Barry & Sinkinson traveled around the world competing regularly and winning Grand Slam titles such as: the UK Championship, European Open Championship and World Championship. After winning the Blackpool Open Amateur Competition Loraine and Andrew decided to turn Professional in 1989.

Professional dance career
In 1990 Barry and Sinkinson competed for the first time professionally at the Professional British Open and won the Slow Foxtrot over Marcus & Karen Hilton, and John Wood & Anne Lewis. This was deemed to be an unprecedented result for the couple as it was their first British Open Competition. In 1993 Barry and Sinkinson ended their partnership.

In 1993, Barry took up a partnership with Luca Baricchi. Together, they were crowned World Ballroom Dance Champions in 1999 and 2001 and British Open Champions three times 1999, 2000, & 2001, among many other accomplishments.

Loraine has also been awarded the Prince Mikasa Award, BDF Award, and Carl Alan Award.

Media career
Since January 2017, Barry has been a judge on  the Irish version of Dancing with the Stars for RTÉ One alongside Brian Redmond and Julian Benson with Arthur Gourounlian joining the panel in 2022.

References

External links 

1964 births
Living people
Irish female dancers
Dancing with the Stars (Irish TV series)
Dancers from Dublin (city)